Puksib (Puksipi) is a rural locality (a selo) in Kosinskoye Rural Settlement, Kosinsky District, Perm Krai, Russia. The population was 354 as of 2010. There are 6 streets.

Geography 
Puksib is located 21 km south of Kosa (the district's administrative centre) by road. Voyvyl is the nearest rural locality.

References 

Rural localities in Kosinsky District